The 2019 FIBA Africa Under-16 Championship, alternatively the 6th Afrobasket U16, was an international basketball competition held in Praia, Cape Verde from 5–14 July 2019. It served as a qualifier for the 2020 FIBA Under-17 Basketball World Cup in Bulgaria.

Venue

Participating teams
On the eve of the tournament, rosters were finalized for the following participating teams:

Group phase
All times are local Cape Verde Time (UTC-1:00).

Group A

Group B

Knockout phase
All times are local Cape Verde Time (UTC-1:00).

Ninth place game

Bracket

Quarterfinals

5–8 classification

Semifinals

Seventh place game

Fifth place game

Third place game

Final

Final ranking

External links
Official Website

References

2019
2019 in African basketball
2019 in Cape Verdean sport
July 2019 sports events in Africa